Montana's 2nd congressional district is a congressional district in the United States House of Representatives that was apportioned after the 2020 United States census. The first candidates ran in the 2022 elections for a seat in the 118th United States Congress.

From 1913 to 1993, Montana had two congressional seats. From 1913 to 1919, those seats were elected statewide at-large on a general ticket. After 1919, however, the state was divided into geographical districts. The 2nd covered the eastern part of the state, including Billings, Glendive, Miles City, and other towns. After 1993, the second seat was eliminated and the remaining seat was elected .

After the release of the 2020 United States census results, Montana regained its 2nd congressional district. On November 12, 2021, Montana's Districting and Apportionment Commission approved a new congressional map in which the 2nd congressional district would cover the eastern portion of Montana, in a configuration similar to the 1983–1993 map. However, the state capital, Helena, which had historically been in the 1st district, was drawn into the 2nd district.

Statewide election results

List of members representing the district

Recent election results

2022

See also 
 Montana's congressional districts
 List of United States congressional districts

References 
General

Specific

 Congressional Biographical Directory of the United States 1774–present

02
Constituencies established in 1919
1919 establishments in Montana
Constituencies disestablished in 1993
1993 disestablishments in Montana
Constituencies established in 2023
2023 establishments in Montana